XHRCB-FM is a community radio station on 95.3 FM broadcasting from studios in Iguala, Guerrero. The station is owned by the civil association RCBC Comunicación, A.C.

History
RCBC Comunicación was founded as Radio Comunitaria de Buenavista de Cuéllar, which operated as a pirate on 97.7 MHz. After filing for the station on November 30, 2015, on March 8, 2017, the Federal Telecommunications Institute (IFT) awarded RCBC Comunicación the concession for XHRCB-FM 95.3.

XHRCB began transmissions on May 17, 2018, with an inauguration ceremony featuring Iguala mayor Herón Delgado Castañeda and state social development secretary Sergio Adrián Mota Pineda.

References

Radio stations in Guerrero
Community radio stations in Mexico
Radio stations established in 2018